The Australian blackspotted catshark (Aulohalaelurus labiosus) is a catshark of the family Scyliorhinidae in the order Carcharhiniformes. It is endemic to Western Australia in the eastern Indian Ocean between latitudes 28° S and 36° S. It can grow up to 67 cm.

References

 

Australian blackspotted catshark
Marine fish of Western Australia
Australian blackspotted catshark